"Ti amo" (Italian for "I love you") is a 1977 song recorded by Italian singer Umberto Tozzi from the album È nell'aria...ti amo. It achieved success at the time, becoming a hit in many European countries, including Sweden and Switzerland where it topped the charts. The duet version featured Monica Bellucci for the film Asterix & Obelix: Mission Cleopatra, and the English versions "I Love You (Ti Amo)" and "You and I (Ti Amo)" were also released. A Spanish version was released as "Te Amo", and had a good success in Spain and Latin America. Within the German-speaking countries a German version by Howard Carpendale also received a great success in 1977, peaking at number two in Germany and number ten in Austria. In 2002, the song was overdubbed as duet with singer Lena Ka under the title "Ti amo (rien que des mots)", with Italian and French lyrics. This version was a success in France and Belgium (Wallonia), reaching the top three. At the time, the original version was re-released and achieved a moderate success in France. As of August 2014, it is the 52nd best-selling single of the 21st century in France, with 393,000 units sold. A French version of this song was recorded by Dalida in 1977. An English version was also recorded by Laura Branigan in 1984, which, most notably, was a hit in Australia (reaching #2). In 2011, Sergio Dalma took a Spanish-language version of the song to the Top 10 in Spain. In 2017, to celebrate the 40 year anniversary of the song, Tozzi released an Italian-English version and music video featuring Anastacia.

Track listings
 1977 version
 7" single
 "Ti amo" – 4:07
 "Dimentica, dimentica" – 4:10
 Spain 7" single
 "Te amo" (Bigazzi/Tozzi/Spanish lyrics by Carlos Toro & Oscar Gómez) – 4:06
 "Olvidate olvidate" – 4:15

1978 version
 UK 7" single
 "I Love You (Ti Amo)" (Bigazzi/Tozzi/English lyrics by Fred Jay) – 3:59
 "Dimentica, Dimentica" – 4:10
 UK 7" single
 "Ti Amo" (Italian version) – 4:08
 "Ti Amo" (English version) (Bigazzi/Tozzi/English lyrics by Fred Jay) – 4:08

1995 version
 German CD single
"You and I (Ti Amo)" (Bigazzi/Tozzi/English lyrics by Betsy Cook)  – 4:15
"Ti Amo"  – 4:12
"Donna Amante Mia"  – 4:55

 2002 version
 France CD single
 "Ti amo (Rien que des mots)" (Bigazzi/Tozzi/French lyrics by Bruno Berrebi) – 3:56
 "Ti amo" – 4:05

 2017 version
 Digital single
 "Ti amo" (Bigazzi/Tozzi/English lyrics by Diane Warren) – 4:36

Charts

Original version

Weekly charts

Year-end charts

Duet version

Weekly charts

Year-end charts

Certifications and sales

In media
In episode 1 of season 4 of the Netflix Money Heist television series, the song is sung by one of the protagonists, Berlin, at his wedding.

Laura Branigan version

In 1984, American singer Laura Branigan covered "Ti Amo" for her third studio album, Self Control, with English lyrics written by Diane Warren. Her version was released as the album's third single, and was particularly successful in Australia and Canada, where it reached numbers two and five, respectively. Branigan would later perform her version of "Ti Amo" with Umberto Tozzi for a live Italian television show where Umberto played guitar.

Track listings

Charts

Weekly charts

Year-end charts

Sergio Dalma version

In 2011, popular Spanish singer Sergio Dalma included a version of the song on Via Dalma II, his second collection of Italian songs performed in Spanish. Issued as the second single from the disc, "Te Amo" rose to No. 10 on the official chart released by Productores de Música de España and spent 14 weeks on the chart. The iTunes edition of the single featured a duet version with Argentine-Spanish singer Chenoa as well as the original album version. The single was promoted with a black-and-white video clip in which Dalma performs the song dressed in a suit while interacting with an actress.

The song's parent album spent five weeks at No. 1 in Spain, achieving quadruple platinum status after spending 49 weeks on the chart.

Charts

References

1977 singles
1984 singles
2002 singles
Laura Branigan songs
Macaronic songs
Number-one singles in France
Number-one singles in Italy
Number-one singles in Greece
Number-one singles in Sweden
Number-one singles in Switzerland
Umberto Tozzi songs
Songs written by Umberto Tozzi
Songs written by Giancarlo Bigazzi
1977 songs
Italian-language songs
Male–female vocal duets